The Wedding March is a 1915 silent Italian drama film directed by Carmine Gallone.

Cast
 Lyda Borelli as Grazia di Plessans
 Francesco Cacace as Ruggero Lechatelier
 Wanda Capodaglio
 Angelo Gallina
 Leda Gys as Susanna Lechatelier
 Amleto Novelli as Claudio Morillot

See also
 The Wedding March (1929)
 The Wedding March (1934)

References

External links
 

1915 films
1915 drama films
Italian silent feature films
Italian black-and-white films
Films about weddings
Films directed by Carmine Gallone
Italian films based on plays
Italian drama films
Silent drama films